Kazi Abu Zafar Mohammed Hasan Siddiqui (1940 - 16 October 2012) is a recital artist and cultural activist of Bangladesh. He was the Director General of Bangladesh Television. According to Kazi Nazrul Islam's eldest son, the first winner of the Kazi Sabyasachi Award was the personification of Cultural Personality, launched by the Ministry of Culture of the Government of Bangladesh.

Career 
Zafal Siddiqui was born in 1940 in Bardhaman district of West Bengal. He started his first career as an assistant director at East Pakistan Television Corporation in 1970. He has been associated with the profession of recitation and culture for more than 40 years. He was the founding president of Bangabandhu Recruitment Council and vocabulary organization. He was a member of the advisory board of the Bangladesh Recruitment Coordination Council. Beyond that, he was involved with several cultural organizations. He also served as Director of Programs and Planning at Bangladesh Television . In 2009, he became the director general of the television. He retired in February 2012.

Award 
Siddique recipients Kazi Sabyasachi Award by the Ministry of Cultural Affairs in Bangladesh for his contribution to recitation. Lifetime honors (2006-2007 ) were conferred on the media department at the eighth event of the Bachsas Award given by the Bangladesh Cine-Journalist Association.

Death 
Siddiqui died on October 16, 2012. He was buried in the Jurine Cemetery.

References 

2012 deaths
1940 births
Bachsas Award winners